Hemawas is a village in Pali tehsil of Pali district in Rajasthan state of India. It is located to the immediate south of the city of Pali. The nearby Hemawas Dam, completed in 1911, lies on the Bandi river.

Demographics

The population of Hemawas is 4,012 according to the 2011 census, with a male population of 2,061 and a female population of 1,951.

References

Villages in Pali district
Dams in Rajasthan